This list of the Mesozoic life of Idaho contains the various prehistoric life-forms whose fossilized remains have been reported from within the US state of Idaho and are between 252.17 and 66 million years of age.

A

 †Albanites 
 †Albanites americanus – type locality for species
 †Albanites sheldoni
 †Ampezzopleura – tentative report
 †Ampezzopleura tenuis – or unidentified comparable form
 †Amphitomaria – tentative report
 †Amphitomaria obscurecostata – type locality for species
 †Anaflemingites
 †Anaflemingites russelli – type locality for species
 †Anasibirites
 †Anasibirites desertorum
 †Anasibirites lindgreni
 †Andangularia
 †Andangularia babylona – type locality for species
 †Andangularia occidentalis – type locality for species
 †Anemia
 †Anemia fremonti
 †Angularia
 †Angularia rectecostata – type locality for species
 †Anthostylis
 †Anthostylis acanthophora
  †Arcestes – tentative report
 †Arctomeekoceras
 †Arctomeekoceras popovi – type locality for species
 †Arctomeekoceras tardum – type locality for species
 †Aspenites
 †Aspenites acutus
 †Aspiduriella – tentative report
 †Aspiduriella idahoensis – type locality for species
 Astarte
 †Astarte meeki
 †Astraeomorpha
 †Astraeomorpha crassisepta
 †Astrocoenia
 †Astrocoenia idahoensis – type locality for species
 †Austrotindaria
 †Austrotindaria canalensis
 †Austrotindaria svalbardensis
  †Aviculopecten – report made of unidentified related form or using admittedly obsolete nomenclature
 †Aviculopecten altus – type locality for species
 †Aviculopecten idahoensis
 †Aviculopecten pealei – type locality for species

B

 †Bajarunia
 †Bajarunia jacksoni
 †Bajarunia pilata – type locality for species
 †Bajarunia pilatum
 †Bakevellia
 †Bakevillia
 †Blodgettella
 †Blodgettella enormecostata – type locality for species
 †Borestus – tentative report
 †Brochidiella – type locality for genus
 †Brochidiella idahoensis – type locality for species

C

 †Camptonectes
 †Camptonectes platessiformis
 †Caribouceras – type locality for genus
 †Caribouceras slugense – type locality for species
 †Carteria – type locality for genus
 †Carteria hotspringensis – type locality for species
 †Ceccaisculitoides
 †Ceccaisculitoides hammondi
  Chlamys
 †Chondrocoenia
 †Chondrocoenia idahoensis
 †Chondrocoenia schafhaeutli
 †Cimolodon
 †Cimolodon akersteni – type locality for species
 †Claraia
 †Claraia extrema
 †Claraia stachei
 †Clypites
 †Clypites tenuis – type locality for species
 †Coelostylina
 †Coenastraea
 †Coenastraea hyatti
 †Columbites – type locality for genus
 †Columbites crassicostatus – type locality for species
 †Columbites dolnapaensis – or unidentified related form
 †Columbites isabellae – type locality for species
 †Columbites parisianus – type locality for species
  Corbicula
 †Cordillerites – type locality for genus
 †Cordillerites angulatus – type locality for species
 †Coscaites
 †Coscaites crassus – type locality for species
 Cossmannea
 †Cryptaulax
 †Cryptaulax acutus – type locality for species
 †Cryptaulax gruendeli – type locality for species
 †Cryptaulax nezperceorum – type locality for species
 †Cryptaulax rhabdocolpoides
 †Cryptaulax wallowaensis – type locality for species
 †Cryptorhynchia
 †Cryptorhynchia bearensis – type locality for species
 †Ctenostreon
 †Ctenostreon gikshanensis – or unidentified comparable form
 †Cupressinoxylon
 †Cyathocoenia
 †Cyathocoenia squiresi
  †Cycadeoidea
 †Cylindrobullina – tentative report
    †Cymbospondylus

D

 †Dagnoceras
 †Dagnoceras bonnevillense
 †Dagnoceras pealei
 †Dagnoceras zappanense – or unidentified related form
 †Dalmatites
 †Dalmatites attenuatus
 †Dalmatites richardsi
 †Dennstaedtia – tentative report
 †Dennstaedtia fremonti
 †Deweveria
 †Deweveria dudresnayi – type locality for species
 †Diatrypesis
 †Diatrypesis newelli – type locality for species
 †Dicosmos
 †Dieneroceras
 †Dieneroceras dieneri
 †Distichophyllia
 †Distichophyllia norica

E

 †Elysastraea
 †Elysastraea profunda
 †Elysastraea vancouverensis
 †Endostoma – tentative report
 †Enoploceras
 †Enoploceras newelli – type locality for species
 †Entolioides
 †Entolioides utahensis
 †Eocalliostoma
 †Eocalliostoma idahoensis – type locality for species
 †Eocalliostoma multicostata – type locality for species
 †Eschericeratites – type locality for genus
 †Eschericeratites lytoceratoides – type locality for species
 †Euchrysalis – tentative report
 †Eucycloscala
 †Eucycloscala binodosa – or unidentified related form
 †Euflemingites
 †Euflemingites cirratus – type locality for species
 †Eumicrotis – report made of unidentified related form or using admittedly obsolete nomenclature
 †Eumicrotis curta
 †Eumorphotis
 †Eumorphotis multiformis

F

 †Fengshanites
 †Fengshanites americanus
 †Flemingites
 †Flemingites aspenensis
 †Flemingites bannockensis
 †Flemingites cirratus

G

 †Gablonzeria
 †Gablonzeria major
 †Gablonzeria profunda
 †Germanonautilus
 †Germanonautilus montpelierensis – type locality for species
  †Gervillia – report made of unidentified related form or using admittedly obsolete nomenclature
 †Glabercolumbites – type locality for genus
 †Glabercolumbites glaber – type locality for species
 Gleichenia
 †Gnomohalorites
 †Gnomohalorites cordilleranus
 †Grammatodon
 †Grammatodon haguei
  †Gryphaea
 †Gryphaea nebrascensis
 †Gryphaea planoconvexa
 †Grypoceras
 †Grypoceras milleri – type locality for species
 †Gudrunella – type locality for genus
 †Gudrunella triassica – type locality for species

H

  †Hedenstroemia
 †Hedenstroemia kossmati
 †Hellenites
 †Hellenites elegans – type locality for species
 †Hellenites idahoense
 †Hemilecanites
 †Hemilecanites paradiscus
 †Hemiprionites
 †Hemiprionites typus
 †Heptastylis – tentative report
 †Heptastylis alpina
 †Heptastylis maculata
 †Holocrinus
 †Holocrinus smithi

I

 †Idahocolumbites
 †Idahocolumbites cheneyi
 †Idahospira – type locality for genus
 †Idahospira multispirata – type locality for species
  †Inoceramus
 †Inyoites
 †Inyoites oweni
 †Isculitoides
 †Isculitoides originis – or unidentified related form

J

 †Jeanbesseiceras
 †Jeanbesseiceras jacksoni – type locality for species
 †Jurassiphorus
 †Jurassiphorus triadicus
 †Juvenites – type locality for genus
 †Juvenites dieneri
 †Juvenites kraffti – type locality for species
 †Juvenites septentrionalis
 †Juvenites thermarum

K

 †Kazakhstanites
 †Kazakhstanites dolnapensis
 †Kiparisovites
 †Kiparisovites ovalis – or unidentified related form
 †Kittliconcha
 †Kittliconcha obliquecostata

L

 †Lamelliphorus
 †Lamelliphorus acutelaminatus – type locality for species
 †Lanceolites
 †Lanceolites compactus
 †Lecanites
 †Lecanites arnoldi
 †Lepismatina
 †Lepismatina mansfieldi – type locality for species
 †Leptochondria
 †Leptochondria curtocardinalis
 †Leptochondria occidanea
 †Levicidaris
  †Lingula
 †Lingularia
 †Liostrea
 †Liostrea strigilecula
 †Litogaster
 †Litogaster turnbullensis – type locality for species
  Lopha
 †Loxopleurus
 †Loxopleurus belliplicatus
 †Lyosoma
 †Lyosoma powelli

M

 †Marcouxia
 †Marcouxia astakhovi
 †Maturifusus – tentative report
 †Maturifusus siphonatus – type locality for species
 †Meekoceras
 †Meekoceras cristatum
 †Meekoceras gracilitatis – type locality for species
 †Meekoceras haydeni
 †Meekoceras micromphalus
 †Meekoceras mushbachanum
 †Meekoceras patelliforme
 †Meekoceras sanctorum
 †Megasphaeroceras
 †Megasphaeroceras rotundum – or unidentified related form
 †Metadagnoceras
 †Metadagnoceras pulchrum – or unidentified related form
 †Metadagnoceras unicum
 †Metussuria
 †Metussuria waageni – type locality for species
 †Microtaenia
 †Microtaenia variabilis
 †Miocidaris
 †Mojsvaroceras
 †Mojsvaroceras frenchi – type locality for species
 †Myalina
 †Myalina postcarbonica

N

 †Naticopsis – tentative report
 †Nemacanthus
 †Nemacanthus elegans – type locality for species
 †Neocolumbites
 †Neogondolella
 †Neogondolella jubata
 †Neoschizodus
 †Neospathodus
 †Neospathodus homeri – tentative report
 †Neospathodus triangularis
  †Nerinea
 †Nodoconus – type locality for genus
 †Nodoconus nodiferus – type locality for species
 †Nordophiceratoides
 †Nordophiceratoides adriani – type locality for species
 †Nordophiceratoides bartolinae – type locality for species
 †Nordophiceratoides catherinae – type locality for species
 †Nordophiceratoides gracilis – type locality for species
  †Normannites
 †Normannites crickmayi – or unidentified comparable form
 †Nuetzelopsis
 †Nuetzelopsis tozeri

O

 †Obnixia – type locality for genus
 †Obnixia thaynesiana – type locality for species
 †Omphaloptycha
 †Omphaloptycha jaworskii
 †Orthoceras
  Ostrea
 †Ostrea strigicula
 †Owenites
 †Owenites koeneni – or unidentified comparable form

P

  †Pagiophyllum
 †Palaeastraea
 †Palaeonarica
 †Palaeonarica lapwaiensis – type locality for species
 †Palaeophyllites – tentative report
 †Pamiroseris
 †Pamiroseris rectilamellosa
 †Pamiroseris smithi
 †Paradelphinulopsis
 †Paradelphinulopsis vallieri
 †Paragoceras
 †Paragoceras malayanus – or unidentified comparable form
 †Paragoceras timorensis – or unidentified related form
 †Paranannites – type locality for genus
 †Paranannites aspenensis – type locality for species
 †Paraphyllanthoxylon
 †Paraphyllanthoxylon idahoense
 †Paullia
 †Pentacrinus
 †Pentacrinus asteriscus
 †Periallus – type locality for genus
 †Periallus woodsidensis – type locality for species
 †Permophorus
 †Permophorus bregeri
 †Permophorus triassicus
 †Phacelophyllia – report made of unidentified related form or using admittedly obsolete nomenclature
 †Phacelophyllia suttonensis
 †Phacelostylophyllum
 †Phacelostylophyllum zitteli
 †Phaedrysmocheilus
 †Phaedrysmocheilus idahoensis – type locality for species
  Pholadomya
 †Pholadomya inaequiplicata
 †Piarorhynchella
 †Piarorhynchella triassica
 †Plagiostoma
 †Plagiostoma occidentalis
 †Platymya
 †Platymya rockymontana
 †Platyvillosus
 †Platyvillosus asperatus
 †Pleuromya
 †Pleuromya subcompressa
  †Pleuronautilus
 †Polygyrina – tentative report
 †Polygyrina subannulata – type locality for species
 †Portneufia – type locality for genus
 †Portneufia episulcata – type locality for species
 †Praelittorina
 †Praelittorina sepkoskii – type locality for species
 †Praesibirites – tentative report
 †Precorynella
 †Preflorianites
 †Preflorianites toulai
 †Procarnites
 †Procolumbites
 †Procolumbites karataucicus
 †Prohungarites
 †Prohungarites beyrichitoides – type locality for species
 †Prohungarites gutstadti
 †Prohungarites mckelvei
 †Promathildia – tentative report
 †Promathildia multituberculata – type locality for species
 †Promyalina
 †Promyalina putiatinensis
 †Promyalina spathi
 †Pronoella
 †Pronoella cinnabarensis
 †Pronoella uintahensis
 †Protocardia
 †Protocardia schucherti – or unidentified comparable form
 †Protodonax
 †Protogusarella – type locality for genus
 †Protogusarella smithi – type locality for species
 †Protorcula – tentative report
 †Protorcula concava – type locality for species
 †Pseudaspidites
 †Pseudaspidites wheeleri
 †Pseudharpoceras
 †Pseudharpoceras idahoense
  †Pseudomelania – tentative report
 †Pseudomonotis
 †Pseudomonotis idahoensis
 †Pseudomonotis pealei
 †Pseudosageceras
 †Pseudosageceras multilobatum – type locality for species
 †Pseudoscalites
 †Pseudoscalites elegantissimus – or unidentified comparable form
    †Pteria – tentative report
 †Pteria ussurica – or unidentified comparable form
 †Ptychomphalus – tentative report
 †Ptychomphalus protei – or unidentified related form
 †Ptychostoma
 †Ptychostoma ornata – type locality for species
 †Pyknotylacanthus – type locality for genus
 †Pyknotylacanthus spathianus – type locality for species
 †Pyrgulifera
 †Pyrgulifera humerosa

Q

 †Quenstedtia
 †Quenstedtia sublevis

R

 †Retiophyllia
 †Retiophyllia clathrata – or unidentified comparable form
 †Retiophyllia dawsoni
 †Retiophyllia parviseptum
  †Rhaetina
 †Rhaetina incurvirostra – type locality for species
  †Rhynchonella – report made of unidentified related form or using admittedly obsolete nomenclature
 †Rudolftruempyiceras
 †Rudolftruempyiceras apostolicum
 †Rudolftruempyiceras apostolicus

S

    †Saurichthys
 †Saurichthys elongatus – or unidentified comparable form
 †Sibirites
 †Sibirites carinatus – type locality for species
 †Silberlingeria
 †Silberlingeria bearlakensis
 †Silberlingeria coronata
 †Silberlingeria sarahjanae – type locality for species
 †Siphonilda – type locality for genus
 †Siphonilda pulchella – type locality for species
 †Sororcula
 †Sororcula gracilis
 †Spiniomphalus – type locality for genus
 †Spiniomphalus duplicatus – type locality for species
 †Spiriferina
 †Spiriferina roundyi
 †Spirostylus
 †Spondylospira
 †Spondylospira lewesensis
 †Stacheites
 †Stacheites concavus
 †Stacheites floweri
 †Stacheites prionoides – or unidentified related form
 †Stemmatoceras
 †Stemmatoceras albertense – or unidentified related form
  †Stephanoceras
 †Stephanoceras skidegatensis – or unidentified comparable form
 †Stylophyllum
 †Stylophyllum paradoxum
 †Subcolumbites
 †Subcolumbites perrinismithi – or unidentified related form
 †Subhungarites
 †Subhungarites yatesi
 †Submeekoceras
 †Submeekoceras mushbachanum – type locality for species
 †Svalbardiceras
 †Svalbardiceras freboldi – or unidentified comparable form
 †Svalbardiceras spitzbergensis – or unidentified related form
 †Svalbardiceras sulcatum – type locality for species

T

 †Tancredia – tentative report
 †Tapponnierites – type locality for genus
 †Tapponnierites tenuicostatus – type locality for species
 †Tardicolumbites – type locality for genus
 †Tardicolumbites tardicolumbus – type locality for species
 †Teinostomopsis – tentative report
  †Tempskya
 †Tempskya wesselii
  †Tenontosaurus
 †Teretrina
 †Teretrina aculeata
 †Teretrina canaliculata – type locality for species
 †Teretrina schulberti – type locality for species
 †Thamnasteria
 †Thamnasteria smithi
 †Thaumastocoelia
 †Thecomeandra
 †Thecomeandra vallieri – type locality for species
 †Tirolites
 †Tirolites harti
 †Tirolites knighti
 †Tirolites pealei
 †Tirolites smithi – type locality for species
 †Tretospira
 †Triadocidaris
  †Trigonia
 †Trigonia montanaensis
 †Tyrsoecus – tentative report

U

 †Ueckerconulus
 †Ueckerconulus noricus – type locality for species
 †Undularia
 †Undularia americana – type locality for species
 †Unionites
 †Ussuria
 †Ussuria occidentalis
 †Ussurites
 †Ussurites mansfeldi
 †Ussurites mansfieldi
 †Ussurites submansfeldi – type locality for species

V

 †Vex – type locality for genus
 †Vex semisimplex – type locality for species
 †Vitimetula – type locality for genus
 †Vitimetula parva – type locality for species

W

 †Weitschatopsis
 †Weitschatopsis pulchra
 †Worthenia
 †Worthenia rhombifera – or unidentified comparable form
 †Wyomingites – type locality for genus
 †Wyomingites aplanatus – type locality for species
 †Wyomingites arnoldi – type locality for species

X

 †Xenoceltites
 †Xenoceltites cordilleranus
 †Xenoceltites crenulatus – type locality for species
 †Xenoceltites spencei
  †Xenodiscus
 †Xenodiscus gilberti
 †Xenodiscus tarpeyi
 †Xenodiscus waageni
 †Xenodiscus whiteanus

Y

 †Yunnania – tentative report
 †Yunnania subcincta
 †Yvesgalleticeras
 †Yvesgalleticeras montpelierense
 †Yvesgalleticeras raphaeli – type locality for species

Z

 †Zardinechinus
 †Zygopleura

References

 

Mesozoic
Idaho
Life